Katherine Levin Farrell (1857–1951) was an American artist known for her paintings and etchings.

Biography

Farrell née Levin was born on March 15, 1857, in Philadelphia. She studied at the Philadelphia School of Design for Women, the Pennsylvania Academy of the Fine Arts (PAFA), the Philadelphia Museum School of Art, and the Drexel Institute. She studied with Thomas Eakins at PAFA.

Farrell  exhibited her work at the Pennsylvania Building and the Woman's Building at the 1893 World's Columbian Exposition in Chicago, Illinois. She also exhibited her work at the Boston Art Club, the Brooklyn Art Association, and the National Academy of Design. In 1938 the Philadelphia Art Alliance held a one-woman show of her work. 

Farell was a member of The Plastic Club in Philadelphia and the Brooklyn Art Association in New York. 

Farrell died in 1951. Her work is in the collection of the Pennsylvania Academy of the Fine Arts.

References

External links
image of Farell's art on MutualArt
image of Farell's landscape Monomoy from the collection of the Pennsylvania Academy of the Fine Arts
inventory of Farell's work on SIRIS - Smithsonian Institution Research Information System

1857 births
1951 deaths
19th-century American women artists
20th-century American women artists
Artists from Philadelphia
Pennsylvania Academy of the Fine Arts alumni
Students of Thomas Eakins
Philadelphia School of Design for Women alumni
University of the Arts (Philadelphia) alumni